Bruener or Brüner may refer to:

People
Franz-Hermann Bruener, more commonly Franz-Hermann Brüner, German public official
Mark Bruener (born 1972), American football player

Places
Bruener Marsh, misspelling of Breuner Marsh

See also
Bruner, a surname
Brunner (disambiguation)